Wyesham Halt was a request stop at Wyesham on the former Wye Valley Railway, it was also used by the Coleford Railway. It was opened on 12 January 1931 and closed in January 1959. The railway between Wyesham Halt and Monmouth Troy was originally built by the Coleford, Monmouth, Usk and Pontypool Railway in 1861.

References

External links
  Information about re-opening the line up, it includes photos and information on the railway before closure
  Photos of the line

Disused railway stations in Monmouthshire
Former Great Western Railway stations
Railway stations in Great Britain opened in 1931
Railway stations in Great Britain closed in 1959